The Blue Swords is a 1949 East German historical drama film directed by Wolfgang Schleif and starring Hans Quest, Ilse Steppat and Alexander Engel. It sold more than 3,299,432 tickets. The film portrays the life of Johann Friedrich Böttger, an alchemist of the early eighteenth century who was held prisoner by the Elector of Saxony in order to discover the secret of gold production. Failing to accomplish this, which he knows to be impossible, he instead works to develop porcelain. The title refers to the symbol of Meissen, a pair of crossed swords. His story had previously been turned into a 1935 film The King's Prisoner, released during the Nazi era.

The sets were designed by the art directors Karl Schneider and Erich Zander. It was shot at the Babelsberg Studios in East Berlin.

Cast
 Hans Quest as Johann Böttger
 Ilse Steppat as Frau von Tschirnhausen
 Alexander Engel as Herr von Tschirnhausen
 Herbert Hübner as Nehmitz
 Willy A. Kleinau as August der Starke
 Marianne Prenzel as Katharina
 Paul Wagner as König Friedrich I.
 Werner Pledath as Kreisamtmann von Wittenberg
 Klaus Miedel as Laskari
 Rolf Weih as Leutnant Menzel
 Albert Bessler as Finanzminister
 Siegfried Dornbusch as Köhler
 Hans Emons as Wildenstein
 Hans Fiebrandt as Gehilfe von Dünnbrot
 Harry Gillmann as Hauknecht im "König von Portugal"
 Sonja Hartke as Maitresse
 Alfred Maack as Wirt "König von Portugal"
 Margarete Schön as Frau Zorn

See also
 The King's Prisoner (1935)

References

Bibliography
 Séan Allan & Sebastian Heiduschke. Re-Imagining DEFA: East German Cinema in its National and Transnational Contexts. Berghahn Books, 2016.

External links
 

1949 films
1940s biographical films
German biographical films
East German films
1940s German-language films
Films directed by Wolfgang Schleif
Films set in the 1700s
German historical films
1940s historical films
German black-and-white films
Films shot at Babelsberg Studios
1940s German films